Apremont is a commune in the Savoie department in the Auvergne-Rhône-Alpes region in south-eastern France.

It lies southeast of Chambéry.

Demography

Vineyards
In the night of 24 November 1248, a massive landslide remodelled the lands of the commune and created a distinctive environment for growing grapes. At an altitude of 350 metres and catching the morning sun, the vines of Apremont, together with the adjoining communes of  Saint-André-les-Marches and  Saint-Baldoph have been productive for centuries and are now the major producer in Savoy with around 400 hectares in cultivation. The chalky soil is particularly favourable to white wines, which predominate.

See also
Communes of the Savoie department

References

External links

Official site

Apremont